Honey Royse Tubino (born January 12, 1993) is a Filipina volleyball player. She currently plays for the Philippine Army Lady Troopers in the Premier Volleyball League.

Volleyball career
Tubino was a member of Perpetual Help Lady Altas women's collegiate volleyball team in the NCAA. She played as the Outside Hitter of the team.

Clubs
  Cagayan Valley Lady Rising Suns - (2012)
  Cignal HD Spikers - (2013 - 2014, 2017)
  Philippine Army Lady Troopers (2015 - 2016, 2021-present)  
  United Volleyball Club (2018)
  Sta. Lucia Lady Realtors (2019-2020)

Awards

Individual

Collegiate

Clubs

References

Filipino women's volleyball players
1993 births
Living people
21st-century Filipino women
Outside hitters